The 1926 United States Senate special election in Massachusetts was held on November 2, 1926.

Former Democratic Senator David I. Walsh defeated incumbent William Morgan Butler, a Republican who was appointed after the death of Republican Senator Henry Cabot Lodge. 

Walsh returned to the U.S. Senate for a 2-year term. He had previously served in the Senate from 1919 to 1925.

Republican primary

Candidates
 William M. Butler, incumbent Senator

Declined
 Channing Cox, former Governor of Massachusetts

Results
Senator Butler was unopposed for the Republican nomination.

Democratic primary

Candidates
 David I. Walsh, former Senator

Results
Walsh was unopposed for the Democratic nomination.

General election

Candidates
 John J. Ballam, founding member of the Communist Party of America (Workers')
 William M. Butler, incumbent Senator (Republican)
 Washington Cook, Republican Executive Councillor and independent candidate for Senate in 1922 (Modification of Volstead Act)
 Alfred Baker Lewis (Socialist)
 David I. Walsh, former U.S. Senator (Democratic)

Results

References

1926
Massachusetts
1926 Massachusetts elections
Massachusetts 1926
Massachusetts
United States Senate 1926